The Society of Legal Scholars (SLS) is the learned society for those who teach law in a university or similar institution or who are otherwise engaged in legal scholarship. As of the beginning of 2016 the Society had over 3,000 members consisting of academic and practising lawyers in a wide variety of subject areas. It has charitable status.

The SLS publishes one of the UK's leading generalist peer-reviewed law journals.

The Society was founded in 1908 by Edward Jenks as The Society of Public Teachers of Law and changed its name to the SLS in 2002.

List of presidents

President of The Society of Public Teachers of Law
 1997–1999: Margaret Brazier
 2000–2001: Joe Thomson

President of The Society of Legal Scholars
 2008–2009: Sarah Worthington
 2010-2011: David Feldman
 2011–2012: Keith Stanton
 2015–2016: Andrew Burrows
 2015–2017: Imelda Maher

Prizes and awards 
The society awards the Peter Birks prize for outstanding legal scholarship, annually. The award is given to outstanding published books by scholars that are within the first 15 years of their academic careers.

References

Law-related learned societies
Law-related professional associations
International organisations based in the United Kingdom
1908 establishments in the United Kingdom
Organizations established in 1908
International learned societies